Nosratabad (also Romanized as Noşratābād) is a village in Katul Rural District, in the Central District of Aliabad County, Golestan Province, Iran. At the 2006 census, its population was 563, in 145 families.

References 

Populated places in Aliabad County